Benjamin Mitchell was the defending champion but chose not to defend his title.

James Duckworth won the title after defeating Marc Polmans 7–5, 6–3 in the final.

Seeds

Draw

Finals

Top half

Bottom half

References 
 Main Draw
 Qualifying Draw

Canberra Tennis International - Singles
2016 in Australian tennis
2016